Brigade antigangs  is a 1966 French-Italian film directed by Bernard Borderie.

Synopsis 
Restaurateur Sartet is investigated over being behind a great many robberies.

When a special task force known as Brigade antigangs under the helm of chief inspector Le Goff catches him red-handed, he has just secretly provided his sister with access to his booty.

Sartet's sister invests the booty in hiring henchmen who are supposed to free Sartet. They eventually kidnap Le Goff's brother who happens to be a famous footballer. The chief inspector is informed his brother is about to die unless the police releases Sartet.

Cast 
 Robert Hossein: chief inspector Le Goff
 Raymond Pellegrin: Robert Sartet
 Gabriele Tinti: Jobic Le Goff
 Pierre Clementi: Trois-Pommes
 Amidou: Nez Cassé ("Broken Nose")
 Ilaria Occhini: Angèle Le Goff
 Michel Galabru: Larmeno
 Patrick Préjean: Beau Môme
 Germaine Delbat: Madame Le Goff
 Michel Tureau: Le Bosco

See also 
 Le clan des siciliens (1969) - based on another book of the same series

References

External links
 
 
Brigade antigangs at “Cinema-francais“ (French)

1966 films
1960s French-language films
1966 crime films
Police detective films
French gangster films
Films based on works by Auguste Le Breton
1960s French films